Masters Football was a six-a-side indoor football competition in the United Kingdom, where players over the age of 35 were chosen by the Masters Football Selection Committee to represent a senior club for which they played. Regional heats were held, and the winners of each progressed forward to a national competition. Events were contested over the course of a single evening (usually on Saturdays or Sundays), with games played in two halves of eight minutes each.

The competition ran from 2000 to 2011, live on the UK subscription channel Sky Sports. In 2022, online streaming platform 360 Sports TV announced they would be reviving the competition.

National Masters

Honours

Venues used

Referees
Two referees are chosen to officiate in each event, from the following list. They are all FA-endorsed except from John Underhill, who is an SFA referee.

 David Elleray
 Dermot Gallagher
 Peter Jones
 Steve Lodge
 Kevin Lynch
 Uriah Rennie
 John R. Underhill
 Jeff Winter

Home Nations

Champions

European Masters Cup

Champions

International Masters Cup

Champions

Malaysia Masters Cup

Champions

References

External links
 

 
Football in the United Kingdom
Indoor soccer competitions
2000 establishments in the United Kingdom
Recurring sporting events established in 2000